John Spencer Square is a neo-Georgian residential garden square in the heart of the Canonbury conservation area in Islington, London, England.

It is named after Sir John Spencer, a wealthy city merchant and Lord Mayor of London in 1594, who lived in nearby Canonbury House.

History 
The neo-Georgian open quadrangle apartment blocks, bordered by Compton Road, St. Pauls Road , Prior Bolton Street and St Mary's Grove, were built on land sold by 1954 by the Earl of Northampton to property companies Western Ground Rents and Oriel Property trust

In the early 1950s, most of the Victorian villas on the site were bomb-damaged or dilapidated and planning permission for a development was granted in 1963 by Islington Borough Council. The development, comprising 80 apartments of one to three bedrooms, was designed by Nash, the Surveyor for Western Ground Rents, and built by Canonbury Construction Co. in 1963-4. The first residents, some still living at the square, purchased their off-plan flats for under £5,000 in 1964, before building was completed, and moved in in April 1965.

Notable residents 
Barbara Castle, Labour politician and former Secretary of State
David Starkey, English constitutional historian

References 

Apartment buildings in London
Residential buildings in London
Buildings and structures in the London Borough of Islington
Garden squares in London